Mami Donoshiro (born 8 March 1975) is a Japanese former professional tennis player.

Donoshiro played on the professional tour in the 1990s and reached 93 in the world rankings as a doubles player. While partnering Ai Sugiyama in 1994 she featured in the main draw at Wimbledon and won the Japan Open, which was her only WTA Tour title.

WTA Tour finals

Doubles (1-0)

ITF finals

Singles: 3 (2–1)

Doubles: 8 (3–5)

References

External links
 
 

1975 births
Living people
Japanese female tennis players
20th-century Japanese women
21st-century Japanese women